Steamhammer may refer to:

 Steam hammer, a steam-powered industrial machine tool
 Phenomena of steam distribution system (Water hammer#Related phenomena)
 Steamhammer (band), English blues-rock band
 Steamhammer (album) (also known as Reflection), debut album of the band Steamhammer
 Steamhammer Records, a subsidiary of the German record label SPV
 Steamhammer (Transformers), the name of several fictional characters in the Transformers Constructicons line